Arsik is an Indonesian spicy fish dish of the Batak Toba and Mandailing people of North Sumatra, usually using the common carp (known in Indonesia as ikan mas or gold fish).<ref>{{cite web | title = Arsik Recipe (Spiced Carp with Torch Ginger and Andaliman – Mandailing Style) | work = Indonesia Eats | date = 12 July 2012 | url = http://indonesiaeats.com/arsik-indonesia''''n-andaliman-spiced-carp-batak/}}</ref>

Distinctively Batak elements of the dish are the use of torch ginger fruit (asam cikala), and andaliman (similar to Sichuan pepper). Common Indonesian vegetables and spices such as shallots, garlic, ginger, fresh turmeric root and chili are also used.

Andaliman, essential for the distinctive taste of the dish, is known to grow only in the Batak highlands of North Tapanuli and Samosir, hence this dish is regarded as being specifically of the Batak Toba and Mandailing people, who dwell in these areas.

Other variations
Besides gold fish or carp, saltwater fish such as rastrelliger (kembung'') and snappers can also be used to make arsik. A meat variant of arsik also exists, with pork as the commonly cooked meat.

See also

Batak cuisine
Escabeche

References

External links
 Resep arsik yang sederhana
 Kakap bumbu arsik 
 Resep dengan sedikit latar belakang budaya
 Masakan Arsik Na Niarsik Simbol Kuliner Bangso Batak

Batak cuisine
Fish dishes